Environmental vegetarianism is the practice of vegetarianism when motivated by the desire to create a sustainable diet that avoids the negative environmental impact of meat production. Livestock as a whole is estimated to be responsible for around 15% of global greenhouse gas emissions. As a result, significant reduction in meat consumption has been advocated by, among others, the Intergovernmental Panel on Climate Change in their 2019 special report and as part of the 2017 World Scientists' Warning to Humanity.

Other than climate change, the livestock industry is the primary driver behind biodiversity loss and deforestation, while being significantly relevant to environmental concerns such as water and land use,  pollution, and unsustainability.

Environmental impact of animal products

Four-fifths of agricultural emissions arise from the livestock sector.

According to the 2006 Food and Agriculture Organization of the United Nations (FAO) report Livestock's Long Shadow, animal agriculture contributes on a "massive scale" to global warming, air pollution, land degradation, energy use, deforestation, and biodiversity decline. The FAO report estimates that the livestock (including poultry) sector (which provides draft animal power, leather, wool, milk, eggs, fertilizer, pharmaceuticals, etc., in addition to meat) contributes about 18 percent of global GHG emissions expressed as 100-year CO2 equivalents. This estimate was based on life-cycle analysis, including feed production, land use changes, etc., and used GWP (global warming potential) of 23 for methane and 296 for nitrous oxide, to convert emissions of these gases to 100-year CO2 equivalents. The FAO report concluded that "the livestock sector emerges as one of the top two or three most significant contributors to the most serious environmental problems, at every scale from local to global". The report found that livestock's contribution to greenhouse gas emissions was greater than that of the global transportation sector; this conclusion was criticized in 2010 by Frank Mitloehner of the University of California, Davis, who noted that the authors had not performed a similar life-cycle analysis for transportation, causing the relative contribution of animal agriculture to be overestimated.

A 2009 study by the Worldwatch Institute argued that the FAO's report had underestimated impacts related to methane, land use and respiration, placing livestock at 51% of total global emissions.

According to a 2002 paper: 
The industrial agriculture system consumes fossil fuel, water, and topsoil at unsustainable rates. It contributes to numerous forms of environmental degradation, including air and water pollution, soil depletion, diminishing biodiversity, and fish die-offs. Meat production contributes disproportionately to these problems, in part because feeding grain to livestock to produce meat—instead of feeding it directly to humans—involves a large energy loss, making animal agriculture more resource intensive than other forms of food production. ... One personal act that can have a profound impact on these issues is reducing meat consumption. To produce 1 pound of feedlot beef requires about 2,400 gallons of water and 7 pounds of grain (42). Considering that the average American consumes 97 pounds of beef (and 273 pounds of meat in all) each year, even modest reductions in meat consumption in such a culture would substantially reduce the burden on our natural resources.

The environmental impacts of animal production vary with the method of production, although "[overall] impacts of the lowest-impact animal products typically exceed those of vegetable substitutes".

Average greenhouse gas emissions per diet

Methane
A 2017 study published in the journal Carbon Balance and Management found animal agriculture's global methane emissions are 11% higher than previous estimates, based on data from the Intergovernmental Panel on Climate Change.

Pesticide use
According to a 2022 report from World Animal Protection and the Center for Biological Diversity around 235 million pounds of pesticides are used for animal feed purposes annually in the United States alone, which threatens thousands of endangered species of plants and animals. The report argues consumers should reduce their consumption of animal products and to transition towards plant-based diets in order to hinder the growth of factory farming and protect endangered species of wildlife.

Land use

A 2003 paper published in the American Journal of Clinical Nutrition, after calculating effects on energy, land, and water use, concluded that meat-based diets require more resources and are less sustainable than lacto-ovo vegetarian diets. "The water required for a meat-eating diet is twice as much needed for a 2,000-litre-a-day vegetarian diet".

According to Cornell University scientists: "The heavy dependence on fossil energy suggests that the US food system, whether meat-based or plant-based, is not sustainable". However, they also write: "The meat-based food system requires more energy, land, and water resources than the lactoovovegetarian diet. In this limited sense, the lactoovovegetarian diet is more sustainable than the average American meat-based diet." One of these Cornell scientists "depicted grain-fed livestock farming as a costly and nonsustainable way to produce animal protein", but "distinguished grain-fed meat production from pasture-raised livestock, calling cattle-grazing a more reasonable use of marginal land".

The use of ever increasing amounts of land for meat production and livestock rearing instead of plants and grains for human diets is, according to sociologist David Nibert, "a leading cause of malnutrition, hunger, and famine around the world."

Land degradation

Another agricultural effect is on land degradation. Cattle are a known cause for soil erosion through trampling of the ground and overgrazing. Much of the world's crops are used to feed animals. With 30 percent of the earth's land devoted to raising livestock, a major cutback is needed to keep up with growing population. Demand for meat is expected to double by 2050; in China, for example, where vegetable-based diets were once the norm, demand for meat will continue to be great in absolute terms, even though demand growth will slow. As countries are developing, incomes are increasing, and consumption of animal products is associated with prosperity. This growing demand is unsustainable.

The ability of soil to absorb water by infiltration is important for minimizing runoff and soil erosion. Researchers in Iowa reported that a soil under perennial pasture grasses grazed by livestock was able to absorb far more water than the same kind of soil under two annual crops: corn and soybeans.

Biodiversity loss

The 2019 IPBES Global Assessment Report on Biodiversity and Ecosystem Services found that the primary driver of biodiversity loss is human land use, which deprives other species of land needed for their survival, with the meat industry playing a significant role in this process. Around 25% of earth's ice-free land is used for cattle rearing. Other studies have also warned that meat consumption is accelerating mass extinctions globally. A 2017 study by the World Wildlife Fund attributed 60% of biodiversity loss to the land needed to rear tens of billions of farm animals.

A May 2018 study stated that while wildlife has been decimated since the dawn of human civilization, with wild mammals plummeting by 83%, livestock populations reared by humans for consumption have increased. Livestock make up 60% of the biomass of all mammals on earth, followed by humans (36%) and wild mammals (4%). As for birds, 70% are domesticated, such as poultry, whereas only 30% are wild.

Water
Animal production has a large impact on water pollution and usage. According to the Water Education Foundation, it takes 2,464 gallons of water to produce one pound of beef in California, whereas it takes only 25 gallons of water to produce one pound of wheat. Raising a large amount of livestock creates a massive amount of manure and urine, which can pollute natural resources by changing the pH of water, contaminates the air, and emits a major amount of gas that directly affects global warming. As most livestock are raised in small confined spaces to cut down on cost, this increases the problem of concentrated waste. Livestock in the United States produces 2.7 trillion pounds of manure each year, which is ten times more than what is produced by the entire U.S. population. There are issues with how animal waste is disposed, as some is used as fertilizer while some farmers create manure lagoons which store millions of gallons of animal waste which is extremely unsafe and detrimental to the environment.

Relation to other arguments

Although motivations frequently overlap, environmental vegetarians and vegans can be contrasted with those who are primarily motivated by concerns about animal welfare (one kind of ethical vegetarianism), health, or who avoid meat to save money or out of necessity (economic vegetarianism). Some also believe vegetarianism will improve global food security, or curb starvation.

Health
A study in Climate Change concluded "if ... average diets among UK adults conformed to WHO recommendations, their associated GHG emissions would be reduced by 17%. Further GHG emission reductions of around 40% could be achieved by making realistic modifications to diets so that they contain fewer animal products and processed snacks and more fruit, vegetables and cereals." A study in The Lancet estimated that the "30% reduction in livestock production" by 2030 required to meet the UK Committee on Climate Change's agricultural would also result in a roughly 15% decrease in ischaemic heart disease.

A 2018 report published in PNAS asserted that farmers in the United States could sustain more than twice as many people than they do currently if they abandoned rearing farm animals for human consumption and instead focused on growing plants.

For developed countries, a CAST report estimates an average of 2.6 pounds of grain feed per pound of beef carcass meat produced. For developing countries, the estimate is 0.3 pounds per pound. (Some very dissimilar figures are sometimes seen; the CAST report discusses common sources of error and discrepancies among such figures.) In 2007, US per capita beef consumption was 62.2 pounds per year, and US per capita meat (red meat plus fish plus poultry) consumption totaled 200.7 pounds (boneless trimmed weight basis).

Support

Globalization and modernization has resulted in Western consumer cultures spreading to countries like China and India, including meat-intensive diets which are supplanting traditional plant-based diets. Around 166 to more than 200 billion land and aquatic animals are consumed by a global population of over 7 billion annually, which philosopher and animal rights activist Steven Best argues is "completely unsustainable". A 2018 study published in Science states that meat consumption is set to increase by some 76% by 2050 as the result of human population growth and rising affluence, which will increase greenhouse gas emissions and further reduce biodiversity.

A 2018 report in Nature found that a significant reduction in meat consumption is necessary to mitigate climate change, especially as the population rises to a projected 10 billion in the coming decades. According to a 2019 report in The Lancet, global meat consumption needs to be reduced by 50 percent to mitigate for climate change.

In November 2017, 15,364 world scientists signed a Warning to Humanity calling for, among other things, drastically diminishing our per capita consumption of meat. 

A 2010 report from the United Nations Environment Programme's (UNEP) International Panel of Sustainable Resource Management stated:

Impacts from agriculture are expected to increase substantially due to population growth and increasing consumption of animal products. Unlike fossil fuels, it is difficult to look for alternatives: people have to eat. A substantial reduction of impacts would only be possible with a substantial worldwide diet change, away from animal products.

The aforementioned Global Assessment Report on Biodiversity and Ecosystem Services also suggested that a reduction in meat consumption would be required to help preserve biodiversity.

According to a July 2019 report by the World Resources Institute the global population will increase to roughly 10 billion by the middle of the century, with demand for ruminant meat rising by 88%. The report posits that Americans and Europeans will need to reduce their beef consumption by 40% and 22% respectively in order to feed so many people and at the same time avert an ecological catastrophe.

In November 2019, a warning on the "climate emergency" from over 11,000 scientists from over 100 countries said that "eating mostly plant-based foods while reducing the global consumption of animal products, especially ruminant livestock, can improve human health and significantly lower GHG emissions (including methane in the “Short-lived pollutants” step)." The warning also says it this will "free up croplands for growing much-needed human plant food instead of livestock feed, while releasing some grazing land to support natural climate solutions."

A 2020 study by researchers from the University of Michigan and Tulane University, which was commissioned by the Center for Biological Diversity, asserts that if the U.S. cut its meat consumption by half, it could result in diet-related GHG emissions being reduced by 35%, a decline of 1.6 billion tons.

Criticism

Bill Mollison has argued in his Permaculture Design Course that vegetarianism exacerbates soil erosion. This is because removing a plant from a field removes all the nutrients it obtained from the soil while removing an animal leaves the field intact. On US farmland, much less soil erosion is associated with pastureland used for livestock grazing than with land used for the production of crops. However, as mentioned above, all dietary change scenarios that assume decreased meat consumption are strictly less land-demanding. Robert Hart has also developed forest gardening, which has since been adopted as a common permaculture design element, as a sustainable plant-based food production system.

In 2017, a study in PNAS claimed that U.S. GHG emissions would only decrease 2.6% (or 28% of agricultural GHG emissions) if animals were completely removed from U.S. agriculture. However, the study's underlying assumptions were heavily criticized. The authors defended their work in a follow-up letter.

See also

Animal–industrial complex
Cowspiracy
Cultured meat
Demitarian
Devour the Earth
Diet for a New America
Entomophagy (another environmental approach for obtaining food)
Environmentalism
Environmental pescetarianism
Environmental veganism
Ethics of vegetarianism
Low-carbon diet
In vitro meat
Regenerative agriculture
Stock-free agriculture
Sustainable diet
Vegan organic gardening

Explanatory notes

References

External links
 Eat Less Meat. Save More Wildlife. Center for Biological Diversity
 Meat Eating and Global Warming a list of articles making the vital connection between meat and climate change
 Ecological footprint calculator Two fields are dietary considerations.
 Dr. Ruth Fairchild of the UWIC's report on veganism and CO2-emissions
 The Vegetarian Society UK - information portal
 EarthSave
 Vegan Society - Environment
 The rise of eco-veganism. NBC News. 4 July 2019.
 The Climate Activists Who Dismiss Meat Consumption Are Wrong. The New Republic, 31 August 2020

Climate change and agriculture
Environmental ethics
Environmentalism
Sustainable food system
Vegetarianism